Raymond Boord  (4 February 1908 – 29 April 1982) was a New Zealand politician of the Labour Party.

Biography

Early life and career
Boord was born in Rotorua in 1908 to Francis Moss Boord and Agnes Jane Boord. His grandfather being one of the first European settlers in Rotorua establishing a farm in the 1860s. Boord was educated initially at Rotorua Boys' High School and later at Feilding Agricultural High School, where he became prominent in debating and was dux of the school. He was also a talented sportsman representing Feilding Agricultural at both rugby and cricket. He then became a sheep farmer for 13 years.

He left New Zealand in May 1940 after enlisting in the army 21st Battalion. He served in Greece, Egypt before being promoted to lieutenant first class in February 1942 then seeing action in the Second Battle of El Alamein. He was wounded in action on 26 March 1943 and was also Mentioned in dispatches (MiD). On 31 January 1945 he was promoted to the temporary rank of major before being promoted with the full rank on 19 May 1945 and was second in command of the 24th Battalion. On 5 July 1945 he was made commanding officer of the 24th Battalion and promoted to the rank of lieutenant-colonel. He returned to New Zealand in February 1946.

Member of Parliament

In June 1947 he was appointed assistant-national secretary of the Labour Party before becoming Labour's research officer.

Boord won the candidate selection for the "new" seat of Rotorua defeating Paddy Kearins. He won the seat and represented the Rotorua electorate from 1954 to 1960, when he was defeated by National's Harry Lapwood.

He was a Cabinet minister under Walter Nash, and was Minister of Customs and Minister of Publicity (1957–1960) in the Second Labour Government. He was also Minister of Broadcasting and oversaw the introduction of television into New Zealand. In February 1959 the first experimental television transmissions were initiated, but Boord ended them after just two weeks over concerns that they were generating too much interest form the public.

Boord was expecting his appointments as Minister of Publicity and Broadcasting, due to his experience as a Labour Party publicity officer, but questioned Nash as to his selection as Minister of Customs. When asking what his duties would be (Nash had previously held the role from 1935 to 1949) Nash simply replied "Make rules and stick to them." Boord later believed that Nash knew that he would have to reintroduce import licensing and wanted a minister who would not bend the rules.

As a remedy for the balance of payments crisis the Labour government inherited, Boord introduced comprehensive import controls in 1958. The extremely detailed import licensing schedules were periodically worked out, specifying how much barley, chaff, flour, rennet and saccharine could be imported into New Zealand. The idea was conceived at a meeting of the Cabinet Committee on Economic Policy on 20 December 1957, chaired by Arnold Nordmeyer, (also attended by Jerry Skinner, Phil Holloway, Henry Lang and Bill Sutch - but not Nash) that the import controls would be the most effective way of dealing with the problem.

Following the overwhelming unpopularity of the 1958 "Black Budget" Boord eased up on import controls in the 1960 budget in an attempt to regain popularity ahead of the general election later that year. The ploy did not work and the government was duly defeated in the December 1960 election at which Boord also lost his own seat.

Post Parliament
After exiting parliament he returned to working his sheep farm. Boord remained politically involved and was an extra-parliamentary confidante of Nash. Nash even went as far as to admit in a letter to Boord that his hearing and memory had deteriorated. Boord was also one of the first people to identify Norman Kirk (then only a first-term backbencher) as a potential future leader.

Boord was elected as a member of both the Bay of Plenty Harbour Board and Rotorua Borough Council. He was hospitalised after he crashed his car on into a power pole near Okere on 24 May 1971 causing bruising and a concussion. Later he served as Mayor of Rotorua from 1971 to 1977. As mayor he received Queen Elizabeth II on behalf of Rotorua during the 1974 Royal Tour.

Boord was appointed a Companion of the Queen's Service Order for public services in the 1975 Queen's Birthday Honours, and in 1977 he was awarded the Queen Elizabeth II Silver Jubilee Medal.

Later life and death
He established the Francis Moss Boord Charitable Trust, in memory of his father, to provide funds for charitable purposes in areas including the development of public reserves and domains.

Boord died at his home in Rotorua in 1982, and was buried at Kauae Cemetery in Ngongotahā.

Honorific eponym
Ray Boord Park in the Rotorua suburb of Westbrook is named after Boord.

Notes

References

|-

1908 births
1982 deaths
People educated at Rotorua Boys' High School
New Zealand farmers
New Zealand military personnel of World War II
New Zealand Army officers
New Zealand Labour Party MPs
Members of the Cabinet of New Zealand
Members of the New Zealand House of Representatives
New Zealand MPs for North Island electorates
Mayors of Rotorua
Companions of the Queen's Service Order
Unsuccessful candidates in the 1960 New Zealand general election
Unsuccessful candidates in the 1946 New Zealand general election
Burials at Kauae Cemetery